Roberto Fernández Bonillo (born 5 July 1962), often known simply as Robert or Roberto, is a Spanish former footballer who played mostly as a central midfielder.

From 1981 and during the next 14 years, he played with Valencia and Barcelona, going on to amass La Liga totals of 439 matches and 95 goals over 15 seasons. He also had two spells at Villarreal, where he started his career.

Roberto represented the Spain national team for nearly one decade, appearing at one World Cup and one European Championship.

Club career
Born in Betxí, Province of Castellón, Fernández started playing professionally with CD Castellón in 1979 after emerging through the ranks of neighbours Villarreal CF. After two years, he moved to another club in the community, Valencia CF, proceeding to total 33 La Liga goals in his first four seasons but suffering relegation in 1986.

Fernández signed for FC Barcelona in the summer of 1986. He scored ten times in 40 matches in his debut campaign, including a penalty in a 2–1 home win against Real Madrid, which won that year's league ahead of the Catalans.

After being an essential unit as Barça won two vice-championships, two Copa del Rey trophies and the 1988–89 European Cup Winners' Cup, Fernández returned to Valencia in 1990. He helped the latter to two consecutive fourth-place finishes, and spent almost the entire 1993–94 on the sidelines due to injury.

For the 1995–96 season, Fernández re-joined another familiar team, Villarreal who now competed in the Segunda División. He scored once in 36 appearances in his third year to help them to achieve a first-ever promotion, being immediately relegated afterwards. He retired in 2001 at almost 39, after two seasons in the second tier with Córdoba CF.

Subsequently, after more than 700 official games, Fernández moved into coaching, being in charge of lowly Valencia B, Orihuela CF and UD Alzira in his native region. In the 2004–05 campaign he was one of four managers for Córdoba, who finished in 19th position and dropped down to Segunda División B.

Fernández returned to Barcelona in the summer of 2015, in directorial capacities. He left in June 2018 after his contract expired, being replaced by Eric Abidal who also played for the club.

International career
Fernández earned 29 caps and scored one goal for Spain in nine years, and was included in the squad for the UEFA Euro 1984 and the 1990 FIFA World Cup tournaments. His debut came during the former's qualifying stage, in a 1–0 home win over Iceland on 27 October 1982 in which he played the full 90 minutes.

International goals

Honours
Castellón
Segunda División: 1980–81

Barcelona
Copa del Rey: 1987–88, 1989–90
UEFA Cup Winners' Cup: 1988–89

Spain U21
UEFA European Under-21 Championship: 1986

See also
List of FC Barcelona players (100+ appearances)
List of La Liga players (400+ appearances)
List of Valencia CF players (+100 appearances)

References

External links

CiberChe biography and stats 

1962 births
Living people
People from Plana Baixa
Sportspeople from the Province of Castellón
Spanish footballers
Footballers from the Valencian Community
Association football midfielders
La Liga players
Segunda División players
Villarreal CF players
CD Castellón footballers
Valencia CF players
FC Barcelona players
Córdoba CF players
Spain youth international footballers
Spain under-21 international footballers
Spain under-23 international footballers
Spain amateur international footballers
Spain international footballers
UEFA Euro 1984 players
1990 FIFA World Cup players
Spanish football managers
Segunda División managers
Segunda División B managers
Valencia CF Mestalla managers
Córdoba CF managers
FC Barcelona non-playing staff